Hemantha G Nag Jayasena (born September 16, 1971) is a Sri Lankan-born Italian cricketer. He is a left-handed batsman and leg-break bowler. Jayasena first played cricket back in 1990, turning out for Sri Lankan Premier League side Panadura Sports Club, though he lasted merely two years under their wing.

Six years later, Jayasena was to discover a new lease of life as a cricketer, playing for his adopted nation of Italy for the first time in 1998. He played for Italy for the first time at the 1998 European Championships, making his debut, and a half century, as an opening batsman for his country against Gibraltar, as well as taking three wickets. He later played in the 2002 European Championships, and in 2004, helped Italy to promotion from Division Two into Division One, despite their slip back down the ladder two years later.

A determined batsman, he quickly made his way up from tailender to opener for Panadura, and, for Italy, commonly starts in the upper-middle order.

External links
Hemantha Jayasena at Cricket Archive 

1971 births
Italian cricketers
Living people
Panadura Sports Club cricketers
Sri Lankan emigrants to Italy
Sri Lankan cricketers